The Norton House is a historic home located at 253 Barcelona Road in West Palm Beach, Florida.  On July 26, 1990, the house was added to the U.S. National Register of Historic Places. It is also a contributing property to the El Cid Historic District.

The Ann Norton Sculpture Gardens consists of the Norton House and  property, and features over 100 sculptures by Ann Weaver Norton (1905–1982), the second wife and widow of Ralph Hubbard Norton (1875–1953).  The sculptures are displayed in the house, studio and gardens, which feature over 300 species of tropical palms.  Ralph Hubbard Norton was the founder of the Norton Museum of Art.

References and external links

Ann Norton Sculpture Gardens - official site
 Palm Beach County listings at National Register of Historic Places
 Florida's Office of Cultural and Historical Programs
 Palm Beach County listings
 Ann Norton Sculpture Gardens

Houses on the National Register of Historic Places in Florida
Buildings and structures in West Palm Beach, Florida
National Register of Historic Places in Palm Beach County, Florida
Sculpture gardens, trails and parks in the United States
Art museums and galleries in Florida
Museums in West Palm Beach, Florida
Artists' studios in the United States
Historic house museums in Florida
Biographical museums in Florida
Women's museums in the United States
Houses in Palm Beach County, Florida
Houses completed in 1935
1935 establishments in Florida